Andrew MacKenzie may refer to:

 Andrew Carr MacKenzie (1911–2001), journalist, novelist and parapsychologist from New Zealand
 Andrew Mackenzie (businessman) (born 1956), CEO of BHP Billiton
 Andrew Peter Mackenzie (born 1964), physicist

See also
Andrew McKenzie (disambiguation)